Chatham is an unincorporated community in Monroe County, Florida, United States, located in the Everglades National Park, approximately  southeast of Everglades City.

Geography

References

Unincorporated communities in Monroe County, Florida
Unincorporated communities in Florida